Vibeuf is a commune in the Seine-Maritime department in the Normandy region in northern France.

Geography

Population

Places of interest
 The church of St. Martin, dating from the nineteenth century.
 A medieval fortified manorhouse.

See also
Communes of the Seine-Maritime department

References

External links

Official commune website 

Communes of Seine-Maritime